Årø may refer to:

Places
 Årø (Denmark), an island off Jutland, Denmark
 Årø, Norway, a neighborhood in the town of Molde in Møre og Romsdal, Norway
 Molde Airport, Årø, an airport in Molde, Norway

See also
Aro (disambiguation)